Chere may refer to:

People
 Celes Chere, a fictional character and protagonist in the video game Final Fantasy VI
 Sébastien Chéré (born 1986), French footballer
 Chere Burger (born 1982), South African dressage rider

Places
 Chère, a river in western France
 Chere (woreda), a woreda in Sidama, Ethiopia

See also
 Bele Chere, a former street festival held in Asheville, North Carolina